Galway Girl may refer to:

"Galway Girl" (Steve Earle song), 2000
"Galway Girl" (Ed Sheeran song), 2017
A Galway Girl, 1979 play by Geraldine Aron